Premna odorata is a species of flowering plant in the Lamiaceae family. It is commonly known as fragrant premna, and is native to the Indian subcontinent, Yunnan, Southeast Asia, New Guinea, and Northern Australia, and naturalized in southern Florida

A small tree rarely reaching 10m, it is used as a source for traditional medicine in the Philippines, and is planted occasionally as an ornamental there and elsewhere.

The island of Siargao in the Philippines is named after P. odorata (known as siargaw or saliargaw in the local languages).

References

odorata
Flora of tropical Asia
Plants described in 1837
Taxa named by Francisco Manuel Blanco